The odd number theorem is a theorem in strong gravitational lensing which comes directly from differential topology.

The theorem states that the number of multiple images produced by a bounded transparent lens must be odd.

Formulation 
The gravitational lensing is a thought to mapped from what's known as image plane to source plane following the formula :

.

Argument 
If we use direction cosines describing the bent light rays, we can write a vector field on  plane .

However, only in some specific directions , will the bent light rays reach the observer, i.e., the images only form where . Then we can directly apply the Poincaré–Hopf theorem .

The index of sources and sinks is +1, and that of saddle points is −1. So the Euler characteristic equals the difference between the number of positive indices  and the number of negative indices . For the far field case, there is only one image, i.e., . The strict proof needs Uhlenbeck's Morse theory of null geodesics.

References

 
 
 
 
 
 
 
 
 
 
 
 Perlick V., Gravitational lensing from a geometric viewpoint, in B. Schmidt (ed.) "Einstein's field equations and their physical interpretations" Selected Essays in Honour of Jürgen Ehlers, Springer, Heidelberg (2000) pp. 373–425

Gravitational lensing
Physics theorems
Equations of astronomy